The 2010–11 season was Partick Thistle's fifth consecutive season in the Scottish First Division, having been promoted from the Scottish Second Division at the end of the 2005–06 season. Partick Thistle also competed in the Challenge Cup, League Cup and the Scottish Cup.

Summary
Partick Thistle finished fifth in the First Division. They reached the Semi-final of the Scottish Challenge Cup, the second round of the League Cup and the fifth round of the Scottish Cup.

Management
Thistle began the 2010–11 season under the management of Ian McCall. On 15 April 2011, McCall resigned as manager, with defender Jackie McNamara being appointed as caretaker manager. McNamara was appointed on a permanent basis at the end of the season, on a rolling one-year contract.

Results and fixtures

Scottish First Division

Scottish Challenge Cup

Scottish League Cup

Scottish Cup

Squad

League table

References

External links
 PTFC Matches

Partick Thistle F.C. seasons
Partick Thistle